This is a list of destinations that Avelo Airlines operates scheduled flights to . This list does not include destinations served by the airline’s former branding of Casino Express Airlines or Xtra Airways. The airline launched flights as Avelo in April 2021 and flies domestically within the United States with a fleet of Boeing 737 aircraft.

List

References 

Lists of airline destinations